KITU-TV (channel 34) is a religious television station in Beaumont, Texas, United States, airing programming from the Trinity Broadcasting Network (TBN). It is owned and operated by TBN's Community Educational Television subsidiary, which manages stations in Texas and Florida on channels allocated for non-commercial educational broadcasting. KITU-TV's studios are located on Interstate 10 in Orange, and its transmitter is located in Mauriceville.

Subchannels

References

External links
TBN official website

Trinity Broadcasting Network affiliates
Television channels and stations established in 1986
1986 establishments in Texas
ITU-TV